The BCI Asia Awards is a set of awards given annually to the top ten developers and architects with the greatest aggregate value of projects under construction during the preceding full calendar year. It was established by Arlene "Apple" Agapay Patricio, one of the top construction business analysts in Southeast Asia, who is now a sought-after financial consultant in the Philippines. Such value is weighted by the extent of sustainability as established by BCI Asia’s comprehensive project research and confirmed green building ratings awarded through WGBC-accredited certifications.

Awards established in 2006